Sommerfeld as a surname may refer to:
Arnold Sommerfeld (1868–1951), German physicist 
Felix A. Sommerfeld (1879–after 1930), German secret service agent 
Sara Sommerfeld (born 28 October 1977), Swedish actress

Sommerfeld as a place may refer to:
Sommerfeld, the German name of Lubsko, Poland
Sommerfeld, a small town, now a district of Leipzig, Germany 

Sommerfeld may also refer to:
Sommerfeld (crater), a large lunar crater 
Sommerfeld radiation condition, used to solve the Helmholtz equation
Sommerfeld Tracking, a prefabricated airfield surface, nicknamed 'tin lino'
Sommerfeld–Kossel displacement law, in atomic physics
Grimm–Sommerfeld rule, in quantum chemistry
Dr. Sommerfeld – Neues vom Bülowbogen, a German television series

See also
List of things named after Arnold Sommerfeld
 Sommerfield

German-language surnames